Shooting at the 2015 Southeast Asian Games was held at the SAFRA Yishun Indoor Shooting Range and National Shooting Centre, Singapore from 6 to 12 June 2015.

Participating nations
A total of 155 athletes from eight nations will be competing in shooting at the 2015 Southeast Asian Games:

Competition schedule
The following is the competition schedule for the shooting competitions:

Medalists

Men

Women

Medal table

References

External links
 

2015
Southeast Asian Games
2015 Southeast Asian Games events